Flourless chocolate cake is a dense cake made from an aerated chocolate custard. The first documented form of the cake was seen in Ferrara, Italy, though some forms of the cake have myths surrounding their origins. The dessert contains no gluten which makes it acceptable for those with celiac disease, gluten-free diets, and during religious holidays in which gluten and grains are not permitted.

Overview
A traditional baking method for a variety of flourless chocolate cakes involves whipping the whites alone and then whipping the yolks into the sugar to increase the air content. The overall effect of this process is a sturdy, but light cake. The chocolate and butter are melted together in either a microwave or double boiler. Once all the ingredients are combined, the resulting batter contains only the starch naturally present in the chocolate. The use of Dutch cocoa powder instead of simple cocoa powder will allow the cake to have a denser fudge-like consistency that the cake is known for. Flourless chocolate cakes typically use simple ingredients including: chocolate, butter, eggs, sugar, cocoa powder, vanilla, salt, and an optional dusting of powdered sugar, chocolate ganache, or berries. The Torta Caprese includes an additional ingredient of almond meal.

Origin 
La Torta Tenerina is an Italian flourless chocolate cake that was first seen in Ferrara, Italy in 1900. It is the first recorded version of the cake. It has an alternative name, Queen of Montenegro, as it was said to be served when King Victor Emmanuel III took the throne of Italy making Elena Montenegro the Queen of Italy. In Ferrara, Italy La Torta Tenerina can be found on many restaurant and bakery menus.

Special Diets

In Jewish cuisine
Flourless chocolate cake is a common dessert among Jewish people during the holiday of Passover since leavened grains cannot be consumed during that holiday.

In gluten-free diets
Flourless chocolate cake is a popular dessert in gluten-free diets. There are several varieties including topping the cake with a chocolate ganache, adding raspberries, or it is frequently served with vanilla ice cream, all of which can be enjoyed by those with gluten-free and celiac-appropriate diets. 

The use of alternative sugars would allow this cake to be enjoyed by those on a keto diet as well.

Similar cakes

Torta Caprese, originating from the Italian island of Capri, is a traditional flourless chocolate cake popular in that region that includes almond flour. This cake has a number of myths surrounding its origins including a baker forgetting to add the flour and that it's a version of an Austrian cake called the Austrian Sachertorte.
A similar cake with little or no flour is known as "fallen" or "molten" chocolate cake and was popularized by, among others, Jean-Georges Vongerichten's restaurants.

See also
 Chocolate mousse
 Cheesecake
 Torte
 List of custard desserts
 List of desserts

References

Jewish baked goods
Custard desserts
Chocolate desserts
Italian cakes
Passover foods
Chocolate cakes